James William Ralph Parker (born 6 November 1980) is a South African-born English former first-class cricketer.

The son of the England Test cricketer Paul Parker, he was born in November 1980 at Durban. He was educated in England at Tonbridge School, before going up to St Catharine's College, Cambridge. While studying at Cambridge, he made two first-class appearances for Cambridge University against Oxford University in The University Matches of 2001 and 2002, in addition to making three first-class appearances for Cambridge UCCE against Middlesex, Essex and Surrey in 2002. For Cambridge University he scored 213 runs with two half centuries and a high score of 86, while for Cambridge UCCE he scored 198 runs with a high score of 55. His overall first-class average was a respectable 45.66.

Notes and references

External links

1980 births
Living people
Alumni of St Catharine's College, Cambridge
Cambridge MCCU cricketers
Cambridge University cricketers
Cricketers from Durban
English cricketers
People educated at Tonbridge School
South African emigrants to the United Kingdom